The Tripura cricket team is a domestic cricket team representing the Indian state of Tripura.

History

Cricket developed later in Tripura than in most other parts of India with competitions first organized in the early 1960s, and the Tripura Cricket Association forming in 1968.
 
Tripura entered the Ranji Trophy, along with Goa and Himachal Pradesh, when the competition was expanded for the 1985–86 season. They have always been one of the weaker sides in the competition. Up to the end of 2020, they had played 183 first-class matches resulting in nine wins, 116 losses and 58 draws. In List A cricket they had played 120 matches resulting in 18 wins, 101 losses and one no-result.

In 1985–86, fielding a team with no previous first-class experience, Tripura lost all four matches, the first three by an innings. In 1986–87 they drew their first match and lost the next three, two of them by an innings. The pattern continued. In 2001–02, their last season playing only against their East Zone neighbours – Assam, Bengal, Bihar and Orissa – Tripura lost two matches by an innings and drew the other two.

The Ranji Trophy was restructured for the 2002–03 season, and the lower-ranked teams from around India began to play each other. Tripura's fortunes improved only slightly at first. They registered two losses by an innings and three draws in 2002–03. In 2003–04 they drew all five matches, gaining a first-innings lead in two of them. In 2004–05 they lost three and drew two.

Tripura's first-class victories
Tripura won their first first-class victory in the 2005–06 season. Until then they had played 87 matches for 65 losses and 22 draws. In their last match of the season, after two draws and two losses, they played Himachal Pradesh at Maharaja Bir Bikram College Stadium in Agartala, Tripura's main home ground. Their captain, Rajib Dutta, scored 32 and 71 not out in a low-scoring match in which no one else reached 50, and Tripura won by 130 runs. Vineet Jain, Tripura's opening bowler, took 2 for 20 and 7 for 29.

Since then Tripura have registered a victory in most seasons. In 2006–07, again at Agartala and captained by Dutta, they beat Jammu and Kashmir by 132 runs, Jain taking 4 for 40 and 5 for 40. In 2007–08, once again at Agartala and now captained by Rajesh Banik, they beat Kerala by four wickets. Dutta top-scored with 47 to give Tripura a narrow first-innings lead, and Jain took 4 for 42 and 2 for 53. In 2008–09, captained by Tushar Saha, they had their first away victory when they beat Services by 54 runs at the Palam A Stadium in New Delhi. In 2009–10, once again at Agartala and captained by Dutta, they beat Rajasthan, who later went on to win the Ranji Trophy in 2010–11 and 2011–12, by one wicket. In 2010–11, captained again by Dutta, they beat Goa by seven wickets at Porvorim, Timir Chanda taking 4 for 35 and 7 for 116.

After a season without a victory Tripura, captained by Ajay Ratra, beat Himachal Pradesh at Atal Bihari Vajpayee Stadium in Nadaun in 2012–13 by 169 runs, Subhrajit Roy scoring 111 in the first innings. Manisankar Murasingh made 29 and 63 and took 4 for 86 and 1 for 34. Tripura's next victory came nearly four years later, when, in their most overwhelming victory to date, they beat Services by 219 runs in 2016–17 at Guwahati after declaring at 340 for 3 in their second innings. Udiyan Bose scored 165 and Smit Patel 127 not out, and the captain, Manisankar Murasingh, scored 22 in each innings and took three wickets in each innings.

In December 2018, during the sixth round of the 2018–19 Ranji Trophy, they beat Goa by 10 wickets. It was the first time that Tripura had won a match by 10 wickets and the first time they had earned a bonus point in the Ranji Trophy. Up to and including that fixture, they had played 171 first-class matches, winning only nine of them. However, in the following month, they were dismissed for 35 runs in their first innings against Rajasthan. It was their lowest total in first-class cricket.

Individual records
Tripura's highest first-class score is 212 by Yogesh Takawale against Hyderabad in 2013–14. The best bowling figures are 8 for 133 by Timir Chanda against Himachal Pradesh in 2011–12. In October 2016 Rana Dutta became the first bowler to take a hat-trick for Tripura.

Rajib Dutta played in Tripura's first five victories, captaining the side in four of them.

Home grounds
Narsingarh Cricket Ground
Maharaja Bir Bikram College Stadium

Players

Squad
Players with International Caps are listed in bold.

Updated as on 25 January 2023

References

External links
 First-class matches played by Tripura
 First-class records for Tripura

Further reading
Raju Mukherji, Eden Gardens: Legend & Romance, Global Cricket School, Mumbai, 2014, pp. 68–72

Indian first-class cricket teams
Cricket in Tripura
Cricket clubs established in 1985
1985 establishments in Tripura